"Heaven Knows" is the second single by Taylor Hicks from his self titled debut. It was announced as the second single by Clive Davis on the sixth season finale of American Idol, where Hicks subsequently performed the song. Arista hoped the song would revive sales of Hicks' album, after the underperformance of Hicks' first single "Just To Feel That Way". It hit the radio adds on May 28, 2007. By July 2008, it had sold about 11,000 copies. As of October 2007 the single had fared only slightly better than his first single, and had not increased sales of the album as hoped.

The song samples Ray Charles' "What'd I Say" and Marvin Gaye's "Ain't That Peculiar".

Chart performance

References

Taylor Hicks songs
Songs written by Matt Serletic
Songs written by Kara DioGuardi
Songs written by Ray Charles
Songs written by Cory Rooney
Songs written by Smokey Robinson
Songs written by Marv Tarplin
Songs written by Bobby Rogers
Songs written by Warren "Pete" Moore
2007 singles
Song recordings produced by Matt Serletic
2006 songs
Arista Records singles